Veneto 9s is a rugby league nines tournament held annually in Monselice, Italy. It is the main event of Italian rugby league and has been running since 2006. The tournament, which is attended by teams all over Europe is held at the Stadio Plebiscito, a 9,000 seater stadium.

Recently it has been known as the Simone Franchini tournament in honour of one of the leading figures in Italian Rugby League. After playing in France and Australia for the North Sydney Bears he died of a heart attack during a match in November 2005. It was brother Tiziano who launched the tournament in his home town.

In 2006 the South Africa national team, British Amateur Rugby League Association (BARLA), Spanish Origin and local Italian and French teams competed.

In 2007 eight teams competed with BARLA beating off Italy national rugby league team, Lyon Villeurbanne, Nanterre, Corbeil and Southgate College as well as some local teams.

The 2008 tournament took place on 14 June. It hoped to attract television coverage and received extra funding from the local council, the Comune di Padova. The UK was represented by two BARLA representative teams A + B as well as London Skolars third team; France sent teams from Corbeil, Salses and Isle de France and there was a team from Germany Bad Reichenhall. Two Italian teams also took part Italy and Amici di Simone. There were three groups of three with four teams going to the final and the rest playing out a bowl final.

Southgate Skolars lifted the Simone Franchini Memorial title in June 2009 at the third attempt after holding off a fierce effort by XIII Catalan Juniors in Padova where heated exchanges were made between both teams, in North-East Italy.  BARLA did not enter this year, teams that entered were XIII Catalan and Amici di Simone, Southgate Skolars played back to back games against XIII Catalan and Amici di Simone, and these were the results.

XIII Catalan    Won 6-4   Try: Harvey. Goal: Vine

Amici di Simone	Won 18-12 Tries: Junor, Obuchowski, Kos. Goals: Vine 3

Amici di Simone	Won 18-10 Tries: Obuchowski 2, Junor, Stocks. Goals: Harvey

XIII Catalan	Drew 6-6  Try: Harvey Goal: Vine

Southgate Skolars squad 2009: 
1	Smokie Junor	-   Full-back	            	
2	Ani Mustafa     -   Wing         		
11	Jerry Obuchowski-   Centre
4	Manny de Jesus  -   Centre		 
5	Dino Kos 	-   Wing	
13	Dan Stocks 	-   Stand-off
7	Stuart Harvey   -   Scrum-half 
14	Nimai Parmar    -   Prop  
15	Phil Browne     -   Hooker	
9	David Johnson   -   Front Rower
8	Michael Engmann	-   Second row 1
12	Dominic Madden	-   Second row 2	
6	Andre Vine 	-   Loose forward		
10	Dion Chapman    -   Centre         	
3	Gavin Willacy   -   Wing

Winners

2006 - Unknown
2007 - BARLA
2008 - BARLA B
2009 - Southgate Skolars

Bowl

2008 Isle de France

See also

References

External links

Recurring sporting events established in 2006
Rugby league in Italy
Rugby league nines
European rugby league competitions